USS New Bedford may refer to the following ships of the United States Navy:

, was a  launched in 1943 and sold for scrap in 1947
, was originally the US Army freighter FS-289 and acquired by the US Navy in 1950; sold in 1996

United States Navy ship names